Emil Valentin Andrae (born February 23, 2002) is a Swedish professional ice hockey defenceman who currently plays on a professional tryout contract for Lehigh Valley Phantoms of the American Hockey League (AHL). He is currently contracted to HV71 in the Swedish Hockey League (SHL). Andrae was drafted 54th overall by the Philadelphia Flyers in the 2020 NHL Entry Draft.

Playing career
Born and raised in Västervik, Sweden, Andrae started to play for the local team Västerviks IK at a very young age. Ahead of the 2017–18 season, Andrae moved to Oskarshamn to play with IK Oskarshamn. Andrae stayed only one season in Oskarshamn before moving to Jönköping to play with HV71.

Andrae signed his first professional contract with HV71 on March 27, 2020.

International play

In 2022, Andrae served as captain of the bronze medal-winning Swedish team at the World Junior tournament. He was named to the Media All-Star team and tied with Connor Bedard for ninth overall scoring.

Career statistics

Regular season and playoffs

International

References

External links
 

2002 births
Living people
HV71 players
IK Oskarshamn players
People from Västervik Municipality
Philadelphia Flyers draft picks
Sportspeople from Kalmar County
Swedish ice hockey defencemen
Västerviks IK players
21st-century Swedish people